Lost and Found is the fourth studio album by English actress and singer Martine McCutcheon and her first in 15 years. It was released on 11 August 2017 by BMG. Its lead single, "Say I'm Not Alone" was released on 30 May 2017, whilst its second single titled "Any Sign of Life" was released on 24 July 2017.

Lost and Found peaked at number 17 on the UK Albums Chart, becoming McCutcheon's highest-charting album since the release of her debut album You Me & Us, which peaked at number 2 in 1999.

Track listing

Charts

References

2017 albums
Martine McCutcheon albums